Mark Allen is a British psychedelic trance DJ and record producer.

Allen is one of the pioneers of the Goa trance movement. He first got into psychedelic dance music in 1991, during his first visit to Goa, India. Allen collaborated with the producer Tim Healey in a band called Quirk. In 1994, he started organising parties in a London-based club Return to the Source. With the other club partners Chris Deckker, Phil Ross and Janice Duncan, he toured across the United Kingdom, United States, Europe, Japan and Israel until 2001.

Discography

As Mark Allen 
 1995 - Brainforest - Chaos Unlimited
 1995 - Storming Heaven - Chaos Unlimited	
 1995 - Aumniscience - Chaos Unlimited	
 1996 - Trancentral Five - A Sonic Initiation - Kickin Records 	
 1996 - Trancentral ~ A Sonic Initiation - Kickin Records 
 1996 - Microtropix - Chaos Unlimited 	
 1996 - Resplendent Divergence - Chaos Unlimited	
 1996 - DJ Tsuyoshi Suzuki* / DJ Mark Allen* - Deck Wizards - Goa Trance Mix - Cyber Production 	
 1996 - Deck Wizards - Psychedelic Trance Mix - Psychic Deli 	
 1997 - Shamanic Trance - Psiberfunk Mix By Mark Allen - Return To The Source 	
 1999 - Inventive Steps - U.S.T.A
 2000 - Explorations - Electric Safari Mix - Return To The Source
 2002 - Most Wanted Presents Mark Allen: Open Air - Ware - Phonokol

As Quirk 
 1997 - Dimension Disco / Cognitive Dissidents - Krembo Records 	
 1997 - Dance With The Devil E.P. - Matsuri Productions 
 1998 - Machina Electrica & Fornax Chemica - Matsuri Productions
 1998 - Shark Matter EP - Matsuri Productions 	
 1999 - Wah Wah Wah E.P. - Matsuri Productions 
 1999 - Quality Control - Matsuri Productions
 1999 - Sale Of The Century / Cognitive Dissidents - Not On Label 	
 2000 - Soft Focus - Automatic Records 	
 2000 - Quirk / Electric Tease - Explorations - Return To The Source
 2001 - Yebo - Automatic Records 	
 2001 - Tribodelic - Transient Records 	
 2002 - The Sound - Plusquam Records

References 

Living people
English electronic musicians
Psychedelic trance musicians
Musicians from London
English session musicians
English DJs
Electronic dance music DJs
Year of birth missing (living people)